Lake Oologah is a reservoir in northeastern Oklahoma. It is located near the towns of Oologah, Nowata, and Claremore.
 of shoreline with 11 lake-side parks. The lake is formed along the Verdigris River, and is a source of water for the Tulsa Metropolitan Area. The purpose of the dam and lake is flood control, water supply, navigation, recreation, and fish and wildlife.

Background
The dam and lake were built by the U.S. Army Corps of Engineers, who still administer it. The project was authorized by the Flood Control Act of 1938 and construction began in 1950. In 1951, construction was halted and resumed in 1955. In 1963, the majority of the project was complete and all facilities were in 1974. In 1976, the City of Tulsa built a pipeline connecting Oologah to the Lynn Lane Reservoir in Tulsa.

Recreation opportunities include a swimming beach, mountain biking, marina, RV and tent camping, picnic tables and a playground. On the east side of the lake, the Will Rogers Country Centennial Trail winds around the shore from the Spillway to Blue Creek Park totaling 18 miles.

Famous American actor, philosopher, cowboy, and writer, Will Rogers, was born on the Dog Iron Ranch which now sits on the shores of Oologah Lake, where it was relocated, since the basin was dammed and flooded.

References

External links
 Oologah Lake Official U.S. Army Corps of Engineers Site
 Oologah Lake information, photos and video on TravelOK.com Official travel and tourism website for the State of Oklahoma
 Oklahoma Digital Maps: Digital Collections of Oklahoma and Indian Territory

Protected areas of Nowata County, Oklahoma
Reservoirs in Oklahoma
Protected areas of Rogers County, Oklahoma
Dams in Oklahoma
United States Army Corps of Engineers dams
Dams completed in 1963
Bodies of water of Nowata County, Oklahoma
Bodies of water of Rogers County, Oklahoma